This is a list of the mammal species recorded in Costa Rica. Of the mammal species in Costa Rica, one is critically endangered, four are endangered, six are vulnerable, and three are near threatened. One species is considered extinct.

The following tags are used to highlight each species' conservation status as assessed by the International Union for Conservation of Nature:

Some species were assessed using an earlier set of criteria. Species assessed using this system have the following instead of near threatened and least concern categories:

Subclass: Theria

Infraclass: Metatheria

Order: Didelphimorphia (common opossums)

Didelphimorphia is the order of common opossums of the Western Hemisphere. Opossums probably diverged from the basic South American marsupials in the late Cretaceous or early Paleocene. They are small to medium-sized marsupials, about the size of a large house cat, with a long snout and prehensile tail.

Family: Didelphidae (American opossums)
Subfamily: Caluromyinae
Genus: Caluromys
 Derby's woolly opossum, Caluromys derbianus VU
Subfamily: Didelphinae
Genus: Chironectes
 Water opossum, Chironectes minimus LR/nt
Genus: Didelphis
 Common opossum, Didelphis marsupialis LR/lc
 Virginia opossum, Didelphis virginiana LR/lc
Genus: Marmosa
 Alston's mouse opossum, Marmosa alstoni LR/nt
 Mexican mouse opossum, Marmosa mexicana LR/lc
Genus: Metachirus
 Brown four-eyed opossum, Metachirus nudicaudatus LR/lc
Genus: Philander
 Gray four-eyed opossum, Philander opossum LR/lc

Infraclass: Eutheria

Order: Sirenia (manatees and dugongs)

Sirenia is an order of fully aquatic, herbivorous mammals that inhabit rivers, estuaries, coastal marine waters, swamps, and marine wetlands. All four species are endangered.

Family: Trichechidae
Genus: Trichechus
 West Indian manatee, Trichechus manatus VU

Order: Cingulata (armadillos)

The armadillos are small mammals with a bony armored shell. They are native to the Americas. There are around 20 extant species.

Family: Dasypodidae (armadillos)
Subfamily: Dasypodinae
Genus: Dasypus
 Nine-banded armadillo, Dasypus novemcinctus LC
Subfamily: Tolypeutinae
Genus: Cabassous
 Northern naked-tailed armadillo, Cabassous centralis DD

Order: Pilosa (anteaters, sloths and tamanduas)

The order Pilosa is extant only in the Americas and includes the anteaters, sloths, and tamanduas.

Suborder: Folivora
Family: Bradypodidae (three-toed sloths)
Genus: Bradypus
 Brown-throated three-toed sloth, Bradypus variegatus LC
Family: Choloepodidae (two-toed sloths)
Genus: Choloepus
 Hoffmann's two-toed sloth, Choloepus hoffmanni LC
Suborder: Vermilingua
Family: Cyclopedidae
Genus: Cyclopes
 Silky anteater, C. didactylus LC
Central American silky anteater, C. dorsalis 
Family: Myrmecophagidae (American anteaters)
Genus: Myrmecophaga
 Giant anteater, Myrmecophaga tridactyla VU
Genus: Tamandua
 Northern tamandua, Tamandua mexicana LC

Order: Primates

The order Primates contains humans and their closest relatives: lemurs, lorisoids, tarsiers, monkeys, and apes. Four species of monkey are native to Costa Rica.

Suborder: Haplorhini
Infraorder: Simiiformes
Parvorder: Platyrrhini (New World monkeys)
Family: Cebidae
Subfamily: Cebinae
Genus: Cebus
 Panamanian white-faced capuchin, Cebus imitator LC
Subfamily: Saimiriinae
Genus: Saimiri
 Central American squirrel monkey, Saimiri oerstedii VU
Family: Atelidae
Subfamily: Alouattinae
Genus: Alouatta
 Mantled howler, Alouatta palliata LC
Subfamily: Atelinae
Genus: Ateles
 Geoffroy's spider monkey, Ateles geoffroyi EN

Order: Rodentia (rodents)

Rodents make up the largest order of mammals, with over 40% of mammalian species. However, there are fewer than 50 rodent species in Costa Rica. They have two incisors in the upper and lower jaw which grow continually and must be kept short by gnawing.

Suborder: Hystricognathi
Family: Erethizontidae (New World porcupines)
Subfamily: Erethizontinae
Genus: Coendou
 Mexican hairy dwarf porcupine, Coendou mexicanus LR/lc
Family: Dasyproctidae (agoutis and pacas)
Genus: Dasyprocta
 Central American agouti, Dasyprocta punctata LR/lc
Family: Cuniculidae
Genus: Cuniculus
 Lowland paca, Cuniculus paca LC
Family: Echimyidae
Subfamily: Eumysopinae
Genus: Hoplomys
 Armored rat, Hoplomys gymnurus LR/lc
Genus: Proechimys
 Tome's spiny-rat, Proechimys semispinosus LR/lc
Suborder: Sciurognathi
Family: Sciuridae (squirrels)
Subfamily: Sciurinae
Tribe: Sciurini
Genus: Microsciurus
 Central American dwarf squirrel, Microsciurus alfari LR/lc
Genus: Sciurus
 Deppe's squirrel, Sciurus deppei LR/lc
 Red-tailed squirrel, Sciurus granatensis LR/lc
 Variegated squirrel, Sciurus variegatoides LR/lc
Genus: Syntheosciurus
 Bangs's mountain squirrel, Syntheosciurus brochus LR/nt
Family: Geomyidae
Genus: Orthogeomys
 Chiriqui pocket gopher, Orthogeomys cavator LR/lc
 Cherrie's pocket gopher, Orthogeomys cherriei LR/nt
 Variable pocket gopher, Orthogeomys heterodus LR/nt
 Underwood's pocket gopher, Orthogeomys underwoodi LR/lc
Family: Heteromyidae
Subfamily: Heteromyinae
Genus: Heteromys
 Desmarest's spiny pocket mouse, Heteromys desmarestianus LR/lc
 Mountain spiny pocket mouse, Heteromys oresterus LR/nt
 Salvin's spiny pocket mouse, Heteromys salvini LR/lc
Family: Cricetidae
Subfamily: Tylomyinae
Genus: Nyctomys
 Sumichrast's vesper rat, Nyctomys sumichrasti LR/lc
Genus: Ototylomys
 Big-eared climbing rat, Ototylomys phyllotis LR/lc
Genus: Tylomys
 Watson's climbing rat, Tylomys watsoni LR/lc
Subfamily: Neotominae
Genus: Peromyscus
 Mexican deer mouse, Peromyscus mexicanus LR/lc
Genus: Reithrodontomys
 Short-nosed harvest mouse, Reithrodontomys brevirostris LR/lc
 Chiriqui harvest mouse, Reithrodontomys creper LR/lc
 Slender harvest mouse, Reithrodontomys gracilis LR/lc
 Mexican harvest mouse, Reithrodontomys mexicanus LR/lc
 Nicaraguan harvest mouse, Reithrodontomys paradoxus LR/nt
 Rodriguez's harvest mouse, Reithrodontomys rodriguezi VU
 Sumichrast's harvest mouse, Reithrodontomys sumichrasti LR/lc
Genus: Scotinomys
 Alston's brown mouse, Scotinomys teguina LR/lc
 Chiriqui brown mouse, Scotinomys xerampelinus LR/lc
Subfamily: Sigmodontinae
Genus: Melanomys
 Dusky rice rat, Melanomys caliginosus LR/lc
Genus: Oecomys
 Trinidad arboreal rice rat, Oecomys trinitatis LR/lc
Genus: Oligoryzomys
 Fulvous pygmy rice rat, Oligoryzomys fulvescens LR/lc
Genus: Oryzomys
 Tomes's rice rat, Oryzomys albigularis LR/lc
 Alfaro's rice rat, Oryzomys alfaroi LR/lc
 Bolivar rice rat, Oryzomys bolivaris LR/lc
 Coues' rice rat, Oryzomys couesi LR/lc
 Boquete rice rat, Oryzomys devius LR/lc
 Talamancan rice rat, Oryzomys talamancae LR/lc
Genus: Rheomys
 Goldman's water mouse, Rheomys raptor LR/lc
 Underwood's water mouse, Rheomys underwoodi LR/lc
Genus: Sigmodon
 Southern cotton rat, Sigmodon hirsutus LC
Genus: Sigmodontomys
 Alfaro's rice water rat, Sigmodontomys alfari LR/lc
 Harris's rice water rat, Sigmodontomys aphrastus CR
Genus: Zygodontomys
 Short-tailed cane rat, Zygodontomys brevicauda LR/lc

Order: Lagomorpha (lagomorphs)

The lagomorphs comprise two families, Leporidae (hares and rabbits), and Ochotonidae (pikas). Though they can resemble rodents, and were classified as a superfamily in that order until the early 20th century, they have since been considered a separate order. They differ from rodents in a number of physical characteristics, such as having four incisors in the upper jaw rather than two.

Family: Leporidae (rabbits, hares)
Genus: Sylvilagus
 Dice's cottontail, Sylvilagus dicei VU
 Eastern cottontail, Sylvilagus floridanus LR/lc
Central American tapetí, Sylvilagus gabbi LC

Order: Eulipotyphla (shrews, hedgehogs, moles, and solenodons)

Eulipotyphlans are insectivorous mammals. Shrews and solenodons closely resemble mice, hedgehogs carry spines, while moles are stout-bodied burrowers.

Family: Soricidae (shrews)
Subfamily: Soricinae
Tribe: Blarinini
Genus: Cryptotis
 Talamancan small-eared shrew, Cryptotis gracilis VU
 Blackish small-eared shrew, Cryptotis nigrescens LR/lc

Order: Chiroptera (bats)

The bats' most distinguishing feature is that their forelimbs are developed as wings, making them the only mammals capable of flight. Bat species account for about 20% of all mammals. 109 species of bats have been recorded in Costa Rica, accounting for half of the country's mammal species, and about 12% of all Chiroptera worldwide.

Family: Noctilionidae
Genus: Noctilio
 Lesser bulldog bat, Noctilio albiventris LR/lc
 Greater bulldog bat, Noctilio leporinus LR/lc
Family: Vespertilionidae
Subfamily: Myotinae
Genus: Myotis
 Silver-tipped myotis, Myotis albescens LR/lc
 Elegant myotis, Myotis elegans LR/nt
 Hairy-legged myotis, Myotis keaysi LR/lc
 Black myotis, Myotis nigricans LR/lc
 Montane myotis, Myotis oxyotus LR/lc
 Riparian myotis, Myotis riparius LR/lc
Subfamily: Vespertilioninae
Genus: Bauerus
 Van Gelder's bat, Bauerus dubiaquercus VU
Genus: Eptesicus
 Brazilian brown bat, Eptesicus brasiliensis LR/lc
 Argentine brown bat, Eptesicus furinalis LR/lc
 Big brown bat, Eptesicus fuscus LR/lc
Genus: Lasiurus
 Desert red bat, Lasiurus blossevillii LR/lc
 Tacarcuna bat, Lasiurus castaneus VU
 Southern yellow bat, Lasiurus ega LR/lc
Genus: Rhogeessa
 Black-winged little yellow bat, Rhogeessa tumida LR/lc
Family: Molossidae
Genus: Cynomops
 Greenhall's dog-faced bat, Cynomops greenhalli LR/lc
Genus: Eumops
 Black bonneted bat, Eumops auripendulus LR/lc
 Dwarf bonneted bat, Eumops bonariensis LR/lc
 Wagner's bonneted bat, Eumops glaucinus LR/lc
 Sanborn's bonneted bat, Eumops hansae LR/lc
Genus: Molossus
 Black mastiff bat, Molossus ater LR/lc
 Bonda mastiff bat, Molossus bondae LR/lc
 Coiban mastiff bat, Molossus coibensis LR/nt
 Velvety free-tailed bat, Molossus molossus LR/lc
 Miller's mastiff bat, Molossus pretiosus LR/lc
 Sinaloan mastiff bat, Molossus sinaloae LR/lc
Genus: Tadarida
 Mexican free-tailed bat, Tadarida brasiliensis LR/nt
Family: Emballonuridae
Genus: Balantiopteryx
 Gray sac-winged bat, Balantiopteryx plicata LR/lc
Genus: Cormura
 Wagner's sac-winged bat, Cormura brevirostris LR/lc
Genus: Cyttarops
 Short-eared bat, Cyttarops alecto LR/nt
Genus: Diclidurus
 Northern ghost bat, Diclidurus albus LR/lc
Genus: Peropteryx
 Greater dog-like bat, Peropteryx kappleri LR/lc
 Lesser doglike bat, Peropteryx macrotis LR/lc
Genus: Rhynchonycteris
 Proboscis bat, Rhynchonycteris naso LR/lc
Genus: Saccopteryx
 Greater sac-winged bat, Saccopteryx bilineata LR/lc
 Lesser sac-winged bat, Saccopteryx leptura LR/lc
Family: Mormoopidae
Genus: Pteronotus
 Naked-backed bat, Pteronotus davyi LR/lc
 Big naked-backed bat, Pteronotus gymnonotus LR/lc
 Parnell's mustached bat, Pteronotus parnellii LR/lc
 Wagner's mustached bat, Pteronotus personatus LR/lc
Family: Phyllostomidae
Subfamily: Phyllostominae
Genus: Chrotopterus
 Big-eared woolly bat, Chrotopterus auritus LR/lc
Genus: Glyphonycteris
 Davies's big-eared bat, Glyphonycteris daviesi LR/nt
 Tricolored big-eared bat, Glyphonycteris sylvestris LR/nt
Genus: Lampronycteris
 Yellow-throated big-eared bat, Lampronycteris brachyotis LR/lc
Genus: Lonchorhina
 Tomes's sword-nosed bat, Lonchorhina aurita LR/lc
Genus: Lophostoma
 Pygmy round-eared bat, Lophostoma brasiliense LR/lc
 White-throated round-eared bat, Lophostoma silvicolum LR/lc
Genus: Macrophyllum
 Long-legged bat, Macrophyllum macrophyllum LR/lc
Genus: Micronycteris
 Hairy big-eared bat, Micronycteris hirsuta LR/lc
 White-bellied big-eared bat, Micronycteris minuta LR/lc
 Schmidts's big-eared bat, Micronycteris schmidtorum LR/lc
Genus: Mimon
 Striped hairy-nosed bat, Mimon crenulatum LR/lc
Genus: Phylloderma
 Pale-faced bat, Phylloderma stenops LR/lc
Genus: Phyllostomus
 Pale spear-nosed bat, Phyllostomus discolor LR/lc
 Greater spear-nosed bat, Phyllostomus hastatus LR/lc
Genus: Tonatia
 Stripe-headed round-eared bat, Tonatia saurophila LR/lc
Genus: Trachops
 Fringe-lipped bat, Trachops cirrhosus LR/lc
Genus: Trinycteris
 Niceforo's big-eared bat, Trinycteris nicefori LR/lc
Genus: Vampyrum
 Spectral bat, Vampyrum spectrum LR/nt
Subfamily: Lonchophyllinae
Genus: Lonchophylla
 Godman's nectar bat, Lonchophylla mordax LR/lc
 Orange nectar bat, Lonchophylla robusta LR/lc
Subfamily: Glossophaginae
Genus: Anoura
 Handley's tailless bat, Anoura cultrata LR/lc
 Geoffroy's tailless bat, Anoura geoffroyi LR/lc
Genus: Choeroniscus
 Godman's long-tailed bat, Choeroniscus godmani LR/nt
Genus: Glossophaga
 Commissaris's long-tongued bat, Glossophaga commissarisi LR/lc
 Gray long-tongued bat, Glossophaga leachii LR/lc
 Pallas's long-tongued bat, Glossophaga soricina LR/lc
Genus: Lichonycteris
 Dark long-tongued bat, Lichonycteris obscura LR/lc
Subfamily: Carolliinae
Genus: Carollia
 Silky short-tailed bat, Carollia brevicauda LR/lc
 Chestnut short-tailed bat, Carollia castanea LR/lc
 Seba's short-tailed bat, Carollia perspicillata LR/lc
Subfamily: Stenodermatinae
Genus: Artibeus
 Aztec fruit-eating bat, Artibeus aztecus LR/lc
 Great fruit-eating bat, Artibeus intermedius LR/lc
 Jamaican fruit bat, Artibeus jamaicensis LR/lc
 Great fruit-eating bat, Artibeus lituratus LR/lc
 Pygmy fruit-eating bat, Artibeus phaeotis LR/lc
 Toltec fruit-eating bat, Artibeus toltecus LR/lc
Genus: Centurio
 Wrinkle-faced bat, Centurio senex LR/lc
Genus: Chiroderma
 Salvin's big-eyed bat, Chiroderma salvini LR/lc
 Hairy big-eyed bat, Chiroderma villosum LR/lc
Genus: Ectophylla
 Honduran white bat, Ectophylla alba LR/nt
Genus: Enchisthenes
 Velvety fruit-eating bat, Enchisthenes hartii LR/lc
Genus: Mesophylla
 MacConnell's bat, Mesophylla macconnelli LR/lc
Genus: Sturnira
 Little yellow-shouldered bat, Sturnira lilium LR/lc
 Highland yellow-shouldered bat, Sturnira ludovici LR/lc
 Louis's yellow-shouldered bat, Sturnira luisi LR/lc
 Talamancan yellow-shouldered bat, Sturnira mordax LR/nt
Genus: Uroderma
 Tent-making bat, Uroderma bilobatum LR/lc
 Brown tent-making bat, Uroderma magnirostrum LR/lc
Genus: Vampyressa
 Striped yellow-eared bat, Vampyressa nymphaea LR/lc
 Southern little yellow-eared bat, Vampyressa pusilla LR/lc
Genus: Vampyrodes
 Great stripe-faced bat, Vampyrodes caraccioli LR/lc
Genus: Platyrrhinus
 Heller's broad-nosed bat, Platyrrhinus helleri LR/lc
 Greater broad-nosed bat, Platyrrhinus vittatus LR/lc
Subfamily: Desmodontinae
Genus: Desmodus
 Common vampire bat, Desmodus rotundus LR/lc
Genus: Diaemus
 White-winged vampire bat, Diaemus youngi LR/lc
Genus: Diphylla
 Hairy-legged vampire bat, Diphylla ecaudata LR/nt
Family: Furipteridae
Genus: Furipterus
 Thumbless bat, Furipterus horrens LR/lc
Family: Thyropteridae
Genus: Thyroptera
 Spix's disk-winged bat, Thyroptera tricolor LR/lc

Order: Cetacea (whales)

The order Cetacea includes whales, dolphins and porpoises. They are the mammals most fully adapted to aquatic life with a spindle-shaped nearly hairless body, protected by a thick layer of blubber, and forelimbs and tail modified to provide propulsion underwater.

Suborder: Mysticeti
Family: Balaenopteridae (baleen whales)
Genus: Balaenoptera 
 Common minke whale, Balaenoptera acutorostrata
 Sei whale, Balaenoptera borealis
 Bryde's whale, Balaenoptera brydei
 Blue whale, Balaenoptera musculus
Genus: Megaptera
 Humpback whale, Megaptera novaeangliae
Suborder: Odontoceti
Superfamily: Platanistoidea
Family: Delphinidae (marine dolphins)
Genus: Delphinus
 Short-beaked common dolphin, Delphinus delphis DD
Genus: Feresa
 Pygmy killer whale, Feresa attenuata DD
Genus: Globicephala
 Short-finned pilot whale, Globicephala macrorhyncus DD
Genus: Lagenodelphis
 Fraser's dolphin, Lagenodelphis hosei DD
Genus: Grampus
 Risso's dolphin, Grampus griseus DD
Genus: Orcinus
 Killer whale, Orcinus orca DD
Genus: Peponocephala
 Melon-headed whale, Peponocephala electra DD
Genus: Pseudorca
 False killer whale, Pseudorca crassidens DD
Genus: Sotalia
 Guiana dolphin, Sotalia guianensis DD
Genus: Stenella
 Pantropical spotted dolphin, Stenella attenuata DD
 Clymene dolphin, Stenella clymene DD
 Striped dolphin, Stenella coeruleoalba DD
 Atlantic spotted dolphin, Stenella frontalis DD
 Spinner dolphin, Stenella longirostris DD
Genus: Steno
 Rough-toothed dolphin, Steno bredanensis DD
Genus: Tursiops
 Common bottlenose dolphin, Tursiops truncatus
Family: Physeteridae (sperm whales)
Genus: Physeter
 Sperm whale, Physeter catodon DD
Family: Kogiidae (dwarf sperm whales)
Genus: Kogia
 Pygmy sperm whale, Kogia breviceps DD
 Dwarf sperm whale, Kogia sima DD
Superfamily Ziphioidea
Family: Ziphidae (beaked whales)
Genus: Mesoplodon
 Gervais' beaked whale, Mesoplodon europaeus DD
 Ginkgo-toothed beaked whale, Mesoplodon ginkgodens DD
 Pygmy beaked whale, Mesoplodon peruvianus DD
Genus: Ziphius
 Cuvier's beaked whale, Ziphius cavirostris DD

Order: Carnivora (carnivorans)

There are over 260 species of carnivores, the majority of which feed primarily on meat. They have a characteristic skull shape and dentition.

Suborder: Feliformia
Family: Felidae (cats)
Subfamily: Felinae
Genus: Herpailurus
 Jaguarundi, Herpailurus yagouaroundi LC
Genus: Leopardus
 Ocelot, Leopardus pardalis LC
 Oncilla, Leopardus tigrinus NT
 Margay, Leopardus wiedii LC
Genus: Puma
 Cougar, Puma concolor LC
Subfamily: Pantherinae
Genus: Panthera
 Jaguar, Panthera onca NT
Suborder: Caniformia
Family: Canidae (dogs, foxes)
Genus: Canis
 Coyote, Canis latrans LC
Genus: Urocyon
 Gray fox, Urocyon cinereoargenteus LC
Genus: Speothos
 Bush dog, Speothos venaticus NT 
Family: Procyonidae (raccoons)
Genus: Bassaricyon
 Northern olingo, Bassaricyon gabbii LR/nt
Genus: Bassariscus
 Cacomistle, Bassariscus sumichrasti LR/nt
Genus: Nasua
 White-nosed coati, Nasua narica LR/lc
Genus: Potos
 Kinkajou, Potos flavus LR/lc
Genus: Procyon
 Crab-eating raccoon, Procyon cancrivorus LR/lc
 Common raccoon, Procyon lotor LR/lc
Family: Mustelidae (mustelids)
Genus: Eira
 Tayra, Eira barbara LR/lc
Genus: Galictis
 Greater grison, Galictis vittata LR/lc
Genus: Lontra
 Neotropical river otter, Lontra longicaudis NT
Genus: Neogale
 Long-tailed weasel, Neogale frenata LR/lc
Family: Mephitidae
Genus: Conepatus
 Striped hog-nosed skunk, Conepatus semistriatus LR/lc
Genus: Mephitis
 Hooded skunk, Mephitis macroura LR/lc
Suborder: Pinnipedia 
Family: Otariidae (eared seals, sea lions)
Genus: Zalophus
 California sea lion, Zalophus californianus LR/lc vagrant
 Galápagos sea lion, Zalophus wollebaeki EN vagrant
Family: Phocidae (earless seals)
Genus: Neomonachus
 Caribbean monk seal, Neomonachus tropicalis EX

Order: Perissodactyla (odd-toed ungulates)

The odd-toed ungulates are browsing and grazing mammals. They are usually large to very large, and have relatively simple stomachs and a large middle toe.

Family: Tapiridae (tapirs)
Genus: Tapirus
 Baird's tapir, Tapirus bairdii EN

Order: Artiodactyla (even-toed ungulates)

The even-toed ungulates are ungulates whose weight is borne about equally by the third and fourth toes, rather than mostly or entirely by the third as in perissodactyls. There are about 220 artiodactyl species, including many that are of great economic importance to humans.

Family: Tayassuidae (peccaries)
Genus: Dicotyles
 Collared peccary, D. tajacu LC
Genus: Tayassu
 White-lipped peccary, Tayassu pecari NT
Family: Cervidae (deer)
Subfamily: Capreolinae
Genus: Mazama
 Red brocket, Mazama temama DD
Genus: Odocoileus
 White-tailed deer, Odocoileus virginianus LR/lc

See also
List of amphibians of Costa Rica
List of birds of Costa Rica
List of non-marine molluscs of Costa Rica
List of reptiles of Costa Rica

Notes

References
 

Costa Rica
Mammals

Costa Rica